Robin Smith is a British artist best known for his long association with 2000AD, including work on Judge Dredd and the Bad City Blue mini-series. For a period, he also served as 2000 AD's art editor.

From 1989 onwards, he drew The Bogie Man for Fat Man Press.

A 2-part interview with Smith appears in the Judge Dredd Megazine, issues 225-226, alongside a new Bogie Man adventure.

Bibliography

Comics work includes:

Bad City Blue -  with Alan Grant (credited as "Craig Lipp"), in 2000 AD #468-477
Judge Dredd - Troublemaker -  with Gordon Rennie, in 2000 AD #2312, 2022 (a tribute to the late Alan Grant)
Tharg the Mighty - The Final Secret (2000 AD Sci-Fi Special, 1980)
Tharg's Future Shocks:
 "The Big Day" - with Alan Moore, in 2000 AD #270, 1982
 "Doin' Time" - with Peter Milligan, in 2000 AD #441, 1985
 "Scablands"  - with Arthur Wyatt, in 2000 AD #1607, 2008
 "Legacy System" - with Arthur Wyatt, in 2000 AD #1640, 2009
The Bogie Man (with John Wagner and Alan Grant):
 The Bogie Man - John Brown Publishing, 128 pages, 1991, 
 Chinatoon - Toxic! #2-9, 1991, started by Cam Kennedy, redrawn and completed by Smith, Atomeka Press, 112 pages, 1993, 
 The Manhattan Project - Toxic! #11-21, 1991, Tundra Publishing, 52 pages, 1992, 
 The Bogie Man - collects the first volume and Chinatoon, Pocket Books, 224 pages, 1998, 
  "Return to Casablanca" - Judge Dredd Megazine #227-233, 2005
L.E.G.I.O.N. #37, 39-43, 46-47, 49-50, 56-58 (inks, with writer Barry Kitson/Alan Grant and pencils by Barry Kitson, DC Comics, 1992–1993
Green Candles - with Tom De Haven, 3-issue mini-series,  Paradox Press, 1995

References

Robin Smith at 2000 AD online

Robin Smith at Lambiek's Comiclopedia

Living people
Year of birth missing (living people)
British comics artists